is the eighth compilation album by Japanese singer Shizuka Kudo. It was released on November 18, 1998, through Pony Canyon. The compilation is Kudo's second ballad collection, following Best of Ballade: Empathy. The album features a selection of previously released ballads, handpicked by Kudo, as well as new recordings in English of three songs: "In the Sky", "Daite Kuretara Ii no ni" and "Ice Rain".

Commercial performance
Best of Ballade: Current debuted at number nine on the Oricon Albums Chart, with 40,000 units sold. The album charted in the top 100 for five straight weeks, selling a reported total of 65,000 copies during its chart run.

Track listing

Charts

References

1998 compilation albums
Shizuka Kudo albums
Pony Canyon compilation albums